Saïd Abed Makasi (born 20 August 1982 in Bukavu) is a former Zaire-born, Rwandan football striker.

On 29 July 2011 Said Makasi sealed signed a one-year deal with Primus National Football League side Rayon Sports.

International career
Makasi is a member of the Rwanda national football team.

Notes

1982 births
Living people
People from Bukavu
Rwandan footballers
Express FC players
Kampala Capital City Authority FC players
SC Villa players
R.W.D.M. Brussels F.C. players
K.V. Mechelen players
Sakaryaspor footballers
Hapoel Petah Tikva F.C. players
Maccabi Herzliya F.C. players
Hapoel Be'er Sheva F.C. players
Difaâ Hassani El Jadidi players
Israeli Premier League players
Liga Leumit players
2004 African Cup of Nations players
Rwandan expatriate footballers
Rwanda international footballers
Expatriate footballers in Belgium
Expatriate footballers in Morocco
Expatriate footballers in Turkey
Expatriate footballers in Israel
Expatriate footballers in Uganda
Rwandan expatriate sportspeople in Belgium
Rwandan expatriate sportspeople in Morocco
Rwandan expatriate sportspeople in Turkey
Rwandan expatriate sportspeople in Israel
Rwandan expatriate sportspeople in Uganda
Association football forwards